Ganga is a 1972 Indian Tamil-language Western film directed and filmed by M. Karnan. The film stars Jaishankar and Rajakokila. It was released on 15 January 1972, and became a commercial success.

Plot 
Kathirvelu, a reformed robber, lives with his wife and son. He raises his son Ganga to be a brave warrior, but Ganga develops a penchant for women and alcoholism. Kathirvelu, one day, sees his son in an drunken state. Enraged, he expels him from the house. At this juncture, his past life comes back in the form of his gang. They force him to join their gang, but Kathirvelu refuses, and he is murdered in front of his wife. Ganga comes to perform the last rites of his father. His mother takes a vow from him that, until he takes revenge on all the four murderers of his father, he should not look at her face.

Cast 
 Jaishankar as Ganga
 S. A. Ashokan
 Major Sundarrajan as Kathirvelu
 Nagesh
 Rajakokila as Gauri
 V. Nagayya
 S. N. Lakshmi
 A. Sakunthala
 Jayakumari
 Pakoda Kadhar
 Vijayarekha

Production 
Ganga was produced under Indhrani Films, and directed by M. Karnan who also handled the cinematography. The story was written by Mahendran, and the dialogue by Ma. Ra, while the editing was handled by G. Kalyanasundaram.

Themes 
Film historian Swarnavel Eswaran Pillai compared Ganga to an earlier Karnan film Kalam Vellum (1970) for being a Western with elements of melodrama combined, along with the protagonist's goal being to avenge a murdered family member. However, while Kalam Vellum focused on the protagonist avenging his sister, Ganga focuses on him avenging his father.

Soundtrack 
The soundtrack was composed by Shankar–Ganesh and the lyrics were written by Kannadasan.

Release and reception 
Ganga was released on 15 January 1972, Despite emerging a commercial success, it was the last Western film in Tamil cinema until the release of Irumbukkottai Murattu Singam in 2010.

References

Bibliography 
 
 

1972 films
1972 Western (genre) films
Films directed by M. Karnan
Films scored by Shankar–Ganesh
Indian films about revenge
Indian Western (genre) films
1970s Tamil-language films